The Darb Kushk Gate (Persian: دروازه درب کوشک) is a historical gate in Qazvin, Iran. It is one of the only 2 remaining city gates of Qazvin, the other being the old Tehran gate.

It was repaired and retiled in 1879 during the reign of Nasereddin Shah Qajar, when Azdolmolk Qazvini was the governor of Qazvin.

References 

Gates
Buildings and structures in Qazvin Province